Swisher (formerly Swisher International, Inc.) is an international tobacco company.

Swisher has manufactured products since 1861 and ships more than two billion cigars a year to more than 70 countries. The company operates worldwide, with its headquarters in Jacksonville, Florida. It has manufacturing facilities in Wheeling, West Virginia and Santiago, Dominican Republic.

History
Swisher was founded in 1861 in Newark, Ohio by David Swisher. It is based in Jacksonville, Florida. In 1958, the machine-manufactured Swisher Sweets brand was introduced, and by 1964, the company was making four million cigars a day that were being shipped to all 50 states and to 47 foreign countries.

Swisher acquired Universal Cigar in 1986, maker of the low-priced machine-rolled Optimo.

In 1966, Swisher was purchased by William Ziegler III's American Maize-Products and he became chairman of the company, where he remained until his death in 2008. He was CEO by 1992 and changed the name to Swisher International. By 1995 Ziegler sold his American Maize-Products and kept (or bought back) Swisher, then took it public as Swisher International Group in December 1996.

Golfer Bob Duval was endorsing the brand in 1998.

In 2014, Swisher acquired Miami-based Drew Estate Tobacco Company that produces a variety of hand-rolled brands such as ACID, Herrera Estelí, Kentucky Fired Cured, Liga Privada, MUWAT, Natural, Nica Rustica, Nirvana Cameroon Selection, Tabak Especial, UnderCrown, and Java by Drew Estate. John Drew had started the company in 1996 with a  stall at the World Trade Center. The Drew brand went through some upheaval after the acquisition, and John Drew was brought back as its president in 2016.

In 2022, Drew Estate partnered with Metallica’s James Hetfield. and Blackened Whiskey to release a new All-Maduro Blackened Cigars “M81." It is said to have been created to pair with Blackened Whiskey.

President and CEO Peter Ghiloni, retired from Swisher in 2018. He had been appointed in 2012, coming from U.S. Smokeless Tobacco Company. John Miller was named as president to replace Ghiloni.

In August 2020, Swisher International, Inc. announced the rebranding to Swisher.

See also
List of cigar brands

References

Cigar manufacturing companies
Tobacco companies of the United States
Companies based in Fairfield County, Connecticut
American companies established in 1861
1861 establishments in Ohio
Manufacturing companies established in 1861